Mordellistena stephani is a species of beetle in the genus Mordellistena of the family Mordellidae. It was described by Downie in 1987.

References

External links
Coleoptera. BugGuide.

Beetles described in 1987
stephani